Benjamin Kai (born on April 17), better known as Benji Cavalli, is a Liberian singer, songwriter, instrumentalist, and dancer. Born in Monrovia, he started singing and dancing at the age of 9. He relocated to the New York City borough of Staten Island as a result of Liberia's first civil war. Between 2008 and 2010, Benji Cavalli had a brief stint with the Philadelphia-based Coupé-décalé group, La Jet Fami. He embarked on a solo career after the group disbanded, and released his debut extended play My Time in 2011. His debut studio album, titled The Bridge, was released in July 2022. Benji Cavalli was nominated for New Age Gbema Artist of the Year at the 2016 Liberia Music Awards, and won King of the Stage at the 2017 Liberian Golden Awards. His music is a mixture of Afrobeat, highlife and Gbema.

Early life and music career
Benjamin Kai was born on April 17, in Monrovia, Liberia. The eldest child of six, he started singing and dancing when he was 9 years old. He is the nephew of Zack Roberts, one of Liberia's famous musicians and the lead singer of the 1980's band Zack & Geebah. In 1996, Benji Cavalli and his family fled to Ivory Coast as a result of the First Liberian Civil War. His father was killed prior to him and his family relocating to Ivory Coast. A year later, in the winter of 1997, he and his family relocated to the Park Hill area of Clifton, Staten Island. 

In 2008, Benji Cavalli became a member of La Jet Fami, a Philadelphia-based Coupé-décalé band. He embarked on a solo career following the group's disbandment in 2010, and released his debut EP My Time in 2011. In 2015, he released the single "Slow It Down"; it was produced by Just Prince and was the first collaboration between the two musicians. The song was nominated for New Age Gbema Song of the Year at the 2016 Liberia Music Awards. The music video for "Slow It Down" won Best Music Video at the 2016 Liberian Entertainment Awards, and was nominated for Video of the Year at the 2016 Liberia Music Awards. Between 2015 and 2021, Benji Cavalli released a number of singles produced by Just Prince, including "One More Night", "Lazy", and "Spoil Myself". In December 2017, he performed at the Liberian Golden Awards in Australia and won the King of the Stage award. 

Benji Cavalli released his debut studio album, titled The Bridge, on July 18, 2022. It is a blend of Afrobeat and Gbema, the latter of which is a traditional Liberian sound. The album’s lyrical content explores themes of peace, love, celebration, and happiness. Benji Cavalli toured eight U.S cities in support of the album. He has collaborated with Liberian artists such as Eric Geso, D12, and Tamba Hali.

Artistry
Benji Cavalli’s music is a mixture of Afrobeat, highlife and Gbema. From a production standpoint, his music relies heavily on instruments such as bass, drums, congas and horns. He works closely with his frequent collaborator, Just Prince, to write songs from scratch and share creative ideas.

Discography
Albums and EPs
My Time (EP) (2011)
The Bridge (2022)

Singles

Awards and nominations

See also
List of Liberian musicians

References

Year of birth missing (living people)
Liberian singers
Liberian songwriters
Musicians from Monrovia
Living people
Liberian male musicians